Opacibidion is a genus of beetles in the family Cerambycidae, containing the following species:

 Opacibidion opacicolle (Melzer, 1931)
 Opacibidion rugicolle (Nonfried, 1895)
 Opacibidion sulcicorne (White, 1855)

References

Ibidionini